Franklin Louis Schweitzer, last name also spelt Sweitzer, Switzer, or Swietzer, (December 13, 1882 – March 28, 1970) was a Canadian professional ice hockey left winger who was active in the early days of professional hockey, from 1901–1911.

Switzer was born in Stratford, Ontario.

Professional career
In the 1902–03 season Switzer played three games with the Pittsburgh Keystones of the American semi-professional Western Pennsylvania Hockey League. From 1903 to 1907 Switzer played for the Michigan Soo Indians, and for three seasons between 1904–1907 he represented the club in the International Professional Hockey League, the first fully professional hockey league, where he played alongside future Hockey Hall of Fame members Didier Pitre and Jack Laviolette.

The IPHL folded prior to the 1907–08 season and Switzer switched league when he moved north the border to Winnipeg and the Manitoba Hockey League where he represented the Winnipeg Strathconas for 15 games. He also played one game, and registered one goal, for MHL club Winnipeg Maple Leafs that same season. Although only playing in one game for the team Switzer appeared on the Maple Leafs team photo that year. Winnipeg Maple Leafs won the MHL championship in the 1907–08 season and later challenged ECAHA champions Montreal Wanderers for the Stanley Cup in March 1908. Wanderers won the series with the scores of 11-5 and 9-3 and Switzer didn't play in any of the challenge games for the Maple Leafs.

Switzer didn't play in the 1908–09 and 1909–10 seasons. In the 1910–11 season he played one game for Belleville of the EOPHL.

Statistics
Exh. = Exhibition games

Statistics per Society for International Hockey Research at sihrhockey.org

References

Notes

Canadian ice hockey left wingers
Ice hockey people from Ontario
Pittsburgh Keystones (ice hockey) players
Michigan Soo Indians players
Winnipeg Maple Leafs players
1882 births
1970 deaths